The X'Trapolis 2.0 is a series of electric multiple unit (EMU) to be used for Metro Trains Melbourne, part of Alstom's X'Trapolis family. The trains are to start construction in 2022 and enter service between 2024 and 2026. The trains will continue replacing the ageing Comeng fleets on the Craigieburn, Frankston and Upfield lines alongside the High Capacity Metro Trains, which are also currently being built. The trains' maximum capacity is 1241 unlike the Comeng, which had/has a capacity of 1127.

Construction 
The X'Trapolis 2.0s are to be built in Ballarat with a 60% local content quota to support local manufacturing jobs. The Victoria Government is investing $986 million into 25 new X'Trapolis 2.0s in a partnership with Alstom. The project will support 750 jobs in manufacturing and the supply chain. The trains will be replacing the Comeng fleet are anticipated to "be more accessible, reliable and energy efficient." Also included in the $986 million 2021/22 budget is infrastructure including the Craigieburn train maintenance facility to provide more space to store for the more modern trains and improve train maintenance to increase reliability and longevity to the fleet.

Design 
The X'Trapolis 2.0 trains consist of 6 carriages unlike the Comeng, X'Trapolis 100 and Siemens Nexas, which were/are formed as 3-car sets. Features of the X'Trapolis 2.0 also include: 

 Modernised doors to reduce the boarding times at stations to under 40 seconds
 Passenger information systems that would display that train's journey in real time
 Higher energy efficiency to work with a lower network voltage, to fit in line with modern rail systems overseas
 New interior designs including tip-up seating to allow space for wheelchair spaces.
 Designated bicycle storage areas
 Passenger operated automatic wheelchair ramps located behind driver cabs

References 

Alstom multiple units
Public transport in Melbourne
Electric multiple units of Victoria (Australia)
Melbourne rail rollingstock
Proposed public transport in Australia

1500 V DC multiple units of Victoria